Puka Urqu (Quechua puka red, urqu mountain, "red mountain",  Hispanicized spelling Pucaorcco) is a mountain in the Andes of Peru, about  high. It is situated in the Arequipa Region, La Unión Province, Charcana District, and in the Ayacucho Region, Paucar del Sara Sara Province, Oyolo District. Puka Urqu lies west of Charcana, between the mountains Qinchu (Gencho) in the north and Anchaqalla (Anchacalla) in the south.

References 

Mountains of Peru
Mountains of Arequipa Region
Mountains of Ayacucho Region